Nyangabgwe Referral Hospital is a health care institution located in Francistown, Botswana, The hospital was established in 1989.

History 
Nyangabgwe Referral Hospital was established in 1989. It is a Government of Botswana health institution. The hospital is located in the second largest city of Botswana called Francistown. Nyangabgwe has 550 beds, (120-150) beds at the Internal Medicine Department. It is connected to the government of Botswana database system.

Internal Medicine Department 
This department serves several wards at the hospital from the male medical ward, female medical ward, private ward and isolation ward.

Services
The hospital's 24-hour emergency department is able to cater for adults and children. The hospital departments include a Rehabilitation Centre, pharmacy, anti-retroviral treatment for patients with HIV infection and AIDS, post-trauma counseling services, occupational services, laundry services, kitchen services and a mortuary.

Facilities 
Nyangabgwe Referral hospital has an annex, consisting of about 550 beds, space with the basic medical equipment for conducting series of diagnostic test.

References

External links 
 Botswana Ministry of Health

Hospitals in Botswana
Hospitals established in 1989